The Eastern Washington Eagles football team represents Eastern Washington University in the NCAA Division I Football Championship Subdivision. The Eastern Eagles are members of the Big Sky Conference and play at Roos Field, which is known for being the only stadium in college football with a red playing surface.

History

Beginning & NAIA era
Eastern Washington University began fielding a football team in 1901, when the school was known at the time as the 'State Normal School' and the team mascot was the 'Savages'. Eastern's first national affiliation came with joining the NAIA.

Eastern competed in the NAIA until 1977, along the way advancing to the NAIA Football National Championship finals in 1967, losing to Fairmont State 28-21. This marked Eastern Washington's first appearance in a national championship game at any level of competition.

Identity changes

During this time period, the school would undergo numerous changes to its identity. The school name would change in 1937 to the 'Eastern Washington College of Education', then again in 1962 to 'Eastern Washington State College'. The final change to the school name came in 1977 when the school was renamed 'Eastern Washington University'.

In 1973, the student body voted to make Eastern's mascot the 'Eagles'. Shortly before that, the Eastern Board of Trustees declared 'Savages', its mascot through its first 92 years, no longer acceptable. Eagles are native to Eastern Washington and thus a logical choice for a replacement.

Transition to NCAA and Big Sky
Eastern joined the NCAA in 1978, and participated at the Division II level as an independent until 1984, when they moved up to Division I-AA (now FCS), also as an independent.

Denied membership to the Big Sky Conference in May 1985, Eastern was extended an invitation in December 1986 to join, starting in July 1987. Eastern continues to participate in the Big Sky to this day and is now the sixth-most tenured member of the conference.

Red Turf and National Championship
The 2010 season would mark a number of firsts for Eastern Washington's football program. The offseason would see a highly publicized move to install a red turf playing surface, the first of its kind in the country. Eastern would utilize the excitement and energy surrounding the program to complete its finest season of competition in the program's history.

The 2010 season concluded with Eastern Washington's first appearance in the FCS Championship Game. Led by the head coach Beau Baldwin the Eagles defeated the Delaware Blue Hens 20–19 in Frisco, Texas to win the school's first national championship in football.

Championships

National championships
Eastern Washington has won one national championship in the FCS.

Conference championships
Eastern Washington has won 26 conference championships since 1901, including ten in the Big Sky Conference.

† Co–champions

Playoff appearances

NAIA Playoffs
Eastern Washington made one appearance in the NAIA playoffs in 1967. They advanced to the NAIA Champions Bowl in Morgantown, West Virginia, where they lost to Fairmont State. The Savages finished with a 1–1 record in NAIA playoff play.

Division I-AA/FCS Playoffs
Their first appearance occurred the next year, when they advanced to the quarterfinals as an independent. The Eagles' best finish came during the 2010 season, when they won the national championship.

Head coaches

Note: Eastern Washington did not field teams from 1910 to 1911, 1917 to 1919, and 1943 to 1945.

Home stadium

The EWU football team plays at Roos Field, opened in 1967 and recently expanded and renovated in 2004 and 2010 to seat 11,702. The stadium was originally named Woodward Field in honor of former Eagles head football and basketball coach Arthur C. Woodward. It replaced the original Woodward Field, which was located near the present JFK Library.

Red turf installation and name change
On February 26, 2010, ESPN reported that Eastern Washington planned to remove the natural grass surface at Woodward Field and replace it with red SprinTurf, the first of its kind, at any level of American football. A funding drive was initiated in late January 2010, with EWU alumnus Michael Roos donating $500,000 toward the installation costs, and fellow alumnus and ESPN personality Colin Cowherd also making a donation.

On May 20, 2010 the Eastern Washington Board of Trustees approved a name change to Roos Field, scheduled for the 2010 season, upon the successful completion of the project. Installation of the red synthetic turf was completed in September 2010, in time for the first home game of the 2010 season against Montana.

The Inferno
Eastern Washington's red playing surface is known as The Inferno. The nickname was chosen through a vote conducted by Eastern on its athletic website, goeags.com. Voting began on August 4, 2010 and allowed fans to choose from seven proposed names: red sea, red zone, inferno, big red, red carpet, ring of fire and lava pit. Inferno finished as the top choice and the nickname was revealed at the first home game with the new field on September 18, 2010.

Rivalries

Montana

The EWU–UM Governors Cup is the game against conference rival Montana, usually played in mid-season in October, alternating between Roos Field in Cheney and Washington–Grizzly Stadium in Missoula. The Eagles currently trail in the overall series with 18 wins, 30 losses, and a tie; it became the Governors Cup in 1998 for the 25th meeting and Montana also leads that series at  through 2017. The Cup was originally contested between EWU and the University of Idaho, from 1984 through 1997.

Portland State

The Eagles also have a new rivalry with the Portland State Vikings in all sports, starting in 2010 called The Dam Cup. Eastern football won the first rivalry match between the two schools in 2010 with a score of 55-17. The purpose of the Dam Cup is to create a rivalry between Portland State University and Eastern Washington University and provide a sense of pride between alumni in the Portland and Spokane areas. Other goals include increasing attendance at events between both schools and building school spirit among each institutions' student body.

† The Governors Cup rivalry with Montana was officially established in 1998, but both teams have played against each other since the date listed above.
‡ The Dam Cup rivalry with Portland State was officially established in 2010, but both teams have played against each other since the date listed above.

Individual award winners
The following Eastern Washington players have been recipients of the noted conference and national award honors.

National award winners – players

Buck Buchanan Award
National Defensive Player of the Year
2008: Greg Peach
2010: J. C. Sherritt

Jerry Rice Award
National Freshman Player of the Year
2013: Cooper Kupp

Touchdown Club of Columbus FCS Player of the Year

Walter Payton Award
National Offensive Player of the Year
2005: Erik Meyer
2011: Bo Levi Mitchell
2015: Cooper Kupp
2021: Eric Barriere

Fred Mitchell Award
National Placekicker of the Year from the NCAA Division I FCS, Division II, Division III, NAIA, and NJCAA levels
2018: Roldan Alcobendas

National Football Foundation National Scholar-Athlete Award

Big Sky Conference honors

Offensive Player of the Year
1997: Harry Leons, QB
2001: Jesse Chatman, RB
2002: Josh Blankenship, QB
2004: Erik Meyer, QB
2005: Erik Meyer, QB
2007: Matt Nichols, QB
2009: Matt Nichols, QB
2010: Taiwan Jones, RB
2011: Bo Levi Mitchell, QB
2013: Vernon Adams, QB
2014: Vernon Adams, QB
2015: Cooper Kupp, WR
2016: Cooper Kupp, WR (Co-POY)
2016: Gage Gubrud, QB (Co-POY)
2020-21: Eric Barriere, QB
2021: Eric Barriere, QB

Defensive Player of the Year
1993: Jason Marsh, LB
1997: Chris Scott, DT
2005: Joey Cwik, LB
2008: Greg Peach, DE
2010: J. C. Sherritt, LB
2018: Jay-Tee Tiuli, DT

Special Teams Player of the Year
2013: Bo Schuetzle, CB

Freshman of the Year
2013: Cooper Kupp, WR

Newcomer of the Year
1990: Harold Wright, RB
2002: Josh Blankenship, QB
2004: Rocky Hanni, OG

Coach of the Year
1992: Dick Zornes
1997: Mike Kramer
2001: Paul Wulff
2004: Paul Wulff
2005: Paul Wulff
2012: Beau Baldwin
2013: Beau Baldwin
2018: Aaron Best

Eagles in the pros
The following former Eastern Washington players are currently playing in one of the two professional football leagues listed below.

National Football League

Canadian Football League

Retired numbers

Future non-conference opponents
Scheduled opponents as of December 21, 2021.

References

External links
 

 
American football teams established in 1901
1901 establishments in Washington (state)

es:Eastern Washington Eagles